Ivo Grbić (born 18 January 1996) is a Croatian professional footballer who plays as a goalkeeper for La Liga club Atlético Madrid and the Croatia national team.

Club career

Hajduk Split
Born in Split, Croatia, Grbić moved to the Hajduk Split academy aged 9, where he remained for the rest of his youth career. A youth international since the U14 level, he has drawn high praise from experts such as Vladimir Beara. At the beginning of the 2014–15 season he became the first goalkeeper of Hajduk Split II in the Treća HNL Jug. His first glimpse of first-team football was in October of the same year, when he acted as the reserve goalkeeper, but he only made his debut on 18 April 2015 in the home defeat to Rijeka, conceding two goals in the last 10 minutes of the game.

Lokomotiva
After lack of opportunities, Grbić became frustrated about his club status, thus eventually rejecting the contract extension and joining Lokomotiva in summer 2018. He made his debut for Lokomotiva on 28 July 2018 in a 4–0 victory over Inter Zaprešić. During 2019–20 season, Grbić played a key role in Lokomotiva's run as they finished second in the Prva HNL and the Cup, qualifying for the Champions League second qualifying round.

Atlético Madrid
On 20 August 2020, Grbić signed a four-year contract with Atlético Madrid in a transfer worth €3.5 million, including additional bonuses and a percentage of the next transfer. His first experience away from his homeland. He debuted on 16 December, in a Copa del Rey 3–0 victory over Cardassar. At his debut for the club, he maintained a clean sheet.

Lille (loan) 
After winning the 2020–21 La Liga with Atlético, Grbić was loaned out to French champions Lille for a season in desire for playtime. He made his Ligue 1 debut two days later, on 21 August, in a 1–1 draw with Saint-Étienne. He made his Champions League debut on 14 September, in a goalless draw with VfL Wolfsburg.

International career
Grbić was capped 23 times for Croatia at youth levels. He was part of Croatia's UEFA Under-21 Euro 2019 squad. He made only one appearance during the tournament, on 24 June in a 3–3 draw with England, when Croatia was already eliminated in the group stage.

Grbić received his first call-up for the senior team on 17 August 2020 for September Nations League fixtures against Portugal and France. However, he did not make his debut until 11 November 2021, when he started in a 7–1 victory over Malta in the 2022 World Cup qualifying. On 9 November 2022, Grbić was named in Zlatko Dalić's 26-man squad for the 2022 FIFA World Cup, where he remained an unused substitute as Croatia finished third.

Personal life
Grbić has named Oliver Kahn as his idol. His father, Josip, was the acting president of Hajduk Split during the 2010–11 season. He died in 2016.

After his debut with Atlético Madrid, Grbić tested positive for COVID-19 but was considered  asymptomatic.

Career statistics

Club

International

Honours
Hajduk Split
Croatian Cup runner-up: 2017–18

Lokomotiva
Croatian Cup runner-up: 2019–20

Atletico Madrid
 La Liga: 2020–21

Croatia
FIFA World Cup third place: 2022

References

External links
 
 hajduk.hr at hajduk.hr
 

1996 births
Living people
Footballers from Split, Croatia
Croatian footballers
Association football goalkeepers
Croatia youth international footballers
Croatia under-21 international footballers
Croatia international footballers
HNK Hajduk Split players
HNK Hajduk Split II players
NK Lokomotiva Zagreb players
Atlético Madrid footballers
Lille OSC players
Second Football League (Croatia) players
Croatian Football League players
First Football League (Croatia) players
Ligue 1 players
2022 FIFA World Cup players
Croatian expatriate footballers
Croatian expatriate sportspeople in Spain
Expatriate footballers in Spain
Croatian expatriate sportspeople in France
Expatriate footballers in France